Carbutt Glacier is a glacier entering Goodwin Glacier to the east of Maddox Peak, close east of Flandres Bay on the west coast of Graham Land.

History
The glacier appears on an Argentine government chart of 1954. It was named by the UK Antarctic Place-Names Committee in 1960 for John Carbutt (1832–1905), American (formerly English) photographer who introduced the first emulsion-coated celluloid photographic cut films, in 1888.

See also
 List of glaciers in the Antarctic
 Glaciology

References
 

Glaciers of Graham Coast